Drumragh may refer to:

Drumragh (Electoral Ward) in Omagh, County Tyrone
Drumragh, County Tyrone, a civil parish and townland in County Tyrone, Northern Ireland
Drumragh Sarsfields, a Gaelic Athletic Association club from Clanabogan, County Tyrone, Northern Ireland
Drumragh Integrated College, an integrated Secondary school in Omagh, County Tyrone
River Drumragh, runs through Omagh, County Tyrone, Northern Ireland